Michiko Ishii (5 February 1933 – 2012) was a Japanese politician.  

Ishii was born on 5 February 1933 and attended the Tokyo College of Pharmacy. She was a member of the Liberal Democratic Party. She served as Minister of the Environment in 1996. She was the 5th woman to become a cabinet minister in Japan.

References

 Climate Change Policy in Japan: From the 1980s to 2015

20th-century Japanese women politicians
20th-century Japanese politicians
1933 births
2012 deaths
Women government ministers of Japan